Sylvester Potts was a singer and composer as well as an off and on member of The Contours and a one time member of The Four Sonics. Songs that he has either composed or co-composed have been recorded by The Contours, Mamie Galore, Jimmy Ruffin and The Temptations.

Personal
Sylvester Potts was on December 22,1938, and attended North Eastern High, the same school where Martha Reeves, Mary Wilson, and Bobby Rogers were educated at. Owing to his love of the music and the excitement he got from it once said he wanted to die on stage.

Career

1950s
In the late 1950s, Sylvester Potts was a member of a group called The Hi-Fidelities whose line up consisted of Huey Davis, Potts, Juanita Davis and Tony York. They released two singles, "Street Of Loneliness" bw Pott's own composition, "Help Murder Police" on Hi-Q 5000 in 1957, and "Last Night I Cried" bw "Just Go" on Fortune 528 in 1958. In 1959 late 1950s, Billy Gordon, Billy Hoggs, Joe Billingslea, Potts and Hubert Johnson formed The Blenders in 1959. They would later rename themselves as The Contours. His old friend from The Hi-Fidelities, Huey Davis, also joined the Contours as the group's guitarist.

1960s to 1990s
Potts was a member of The Contours in 1961, replacing member Bennie Reeves who was drafted. In 1963, the Contours single "Don't Let Her Be Your Baby" bw "It Must Be Love" was released. Potts and Joe Billingslea had co-composed the B side.

In 1965, a song "How Can I Say I'm Sorry" he had co-composed with Johnny Gilliam and Norman Whitfield was the B side of a Jimmy Ruffin single, "As Long As There Is L-O-V-E Love". In 1966, a song "It Ain't Necessary" he co-composed with Council Gay and Jerry Butler was the A side of a Mamie Galore single released on St. Lawrence Records 1012.

During the 1970s, Potts had joined The Four Sonics and when he was a member of the group, besides himself, the lineup consisted of Johnson, Bill Frazier, and Vernon Williams. This line-up recorded one single There's No Love" bw "If It Wasn't for My Baby", released on JMC 141.

In 1984, Potts rejoined The Contours which had been restarted by Joe Billingsea in the 1970s.

Potts arranged the backing vocals for the Grazing In The Grass by The Monitors which was released on Motorcity Records MOTCLP 28 in 1990. The 1999 CD version of the Gettin' Ready album by The Temptations which was originally released in 1966 featured "Give It Up" as one of the album's 2 bonus tracks featuring Paul Williams on vocals. Potts was the producer and co-wrote it with Mary Wells.

2000s
In 2004 he left the group and either joined or started a group with Leroy Searooks, Kim Green, Tony Womack and Darrell Nunlee called Upscale. Very shortly the group changed its name to The Contours and legal action followed with Joe Billingsea and Potts suing each other. The result was one group being allowed to perform as The Contours with Joe Billingsea and the other going by the name of The Contours featuring Sylvester Potts. In 2010 at the age of 71 Potts was still on the road with his group and in October 2010 was to appear at the Harmony Hall Regional Center in Fort Washington.

Death
Potts died on January 6, 2017, aged 78, at a local Detroit hospital. His funeral was held on Friday, January 13, 2017, at the Historic Little Rock Missionary Baptist Church in Detroit.

Credits (selective)

References

External links
 F'book The Contours featuring Sylvester Potts

1938 births
2017 deaths
American baritones
American soul singers
Motown artists
Musicians from Detroit
Songwriters from Michigan
African-American songwriters
The Contours members
20th-century African-American people
21st-century African-American people
American male songwriters